is a Japanese former cyclist, who currently works as a directeur sportif for UCI Continental team . He competed in the men's point race at the 1992 Summer Olympics. During his career, he rode for European teams before joining Nippo Hodō in 1991.

References

External links

1962 births
Living people
Japanese male cyclists
Olympic cyclists of Japan
Cyclists at the 1992 Summer Olympics
Sportspeople from Ishikawa Prefecture
Asian Games medalists in cycling
Asian Games silver medalists for Japan
Cyclists at the 1986 Asian Games
Medalists at the 1986 Asian Games
Cyclists at the 1994 Asian Games